Hathaway is an census-designated place and rural farming community about  north of Jennings, Louisiana in Jefferson Davis Parish, with the population of approximately 1,500. There is one school with approximately 800 students that is Pre-K through 12th grade.

References

Unincorporated communities in Jefferson Davis Parish, Louisiana